Dry Brook is a river in Delaware County, New York. It flows through Beaver Meadow Pond before converging with Read Creek north of Readburn.

References

Rivers of New York (state)
Rivers of Delaware County, New York